Suramiri, or Sorkheh Mehri, is a Kurdish tribe living in western and southwestern Iran, as well as parts of eastern Iraq.

History
Suramiri is short for Sorkheh Mehri, which means "a red-haired leader". The Suramiri Kurds are scattered around the provinces of Hamadan, Lorestan, Ilam, Khuzestan, Kermanshah, Sorkheh Mehri, and Cham Seyl in Iran, and the cities of Khanaqin, Badra, and Ali al-Gharbi in Iraq. The Suramiris follow Shia Islam and speak Southern Kurdish.

See also
 Feyli
 Kalhor
 Kurds

References

Diyala Governorate
Ilam Province
Kermanshah Province
Lorestan Province
Hamadan Province
Khuzestan Province
Kurdish tribes
Shia communities
Iranian Kurdistan
Iraqi Kurdistan